Sir John Sydenham, 2nd Baronet (1643–1696) was an English politician who sat in the House of Commons at various times between 1665 and 1679.

Sydenham was the posthumous son of Sir John Sydenham, 1st Baronet of Brimpton, Somerset and his wife Anne Hare, daughter of Sir John Hare of Stow Bardolph, Norfolk, and his wife Elizabeth Coventry, daughter of Thomas Coventry, 1st Baron Coventry of Aylesborough. He was a baronet from birth. In November 1665, he was elected Member of Parliament for Somerset in the Cavalier Parliament  but his election was declared void. He was elected MP for Somerset again in 1669 and was re-elected in 1679 for the First Exclusion Parliament. 
 
Sydenham died at the age of 53.

Sydenham married firstly, Elizabeth Poulett, daughter of John Poulett, 2nd Baron Poulett of Hinton St George and his first wife, Catherine de Vere, daughter of Horace Vere, 1st Baron Vere of Tilbury. She died without issue and was buried at Brimpton in 1669.  He married secondly, Mary Herbert, daughter of Philip Herbert, 5th Earl of Pembroke. She died in 1686, and was buried at Brimpton.

References

1643 births
1696 deaths
Baronets in the Baronetage of England
English MPs 1661–1679
English MPs 1679